Bionectria ochroleuca is a plant pathogen that causes seed rot in oil seed rape.

References

External links
 USDA ARS Fungal Database

Fungal plant pathogens and diseases
Eudicot diseases
Fungi described in 1997
Bionectriaceae